Chicheng, or  Ch’ih-ch’eng, is a county under the administration of Zhangjiakou City, northwestern Hebei province, bordering Beijing to the southeast. China National Highway 112 passes through the county just south of the county seat, Chicheng Town.

It was the setting of Zhang Yimou's 1999 film Not One Less.

History 
It was formerly in the far southeast of Chahar province.

Administrative divisions
Chicheng County is divided into the following 18 divisions:

Climate

References

County-level divisions of Hebei
Zhangjiakou